The Royal Palm Golf and Country Club (RPGCC) is a golf course and social club complex in Lahore, Punjab, Pakistan. It is located on the Canal Bank Road in Lahore. It was previously owned by the Pakistan Railways and called the Pakistan Railways Golf Club. In 2001, the club was sold by Pakistan Railways to the current management and renamed as the Royal Palm Golf and Country Club. It is a national and international sports venue. As of 2013 memberships were the equivalent of $8,000.

In 2004, a large group of Bollywood personalities from India, including Akshay Kumar, Shilpa Shetty and Sajid Khan, were hosted at an event at the club during their visit to Lahore.

See also 
 List of sports venues in Lahore

References

External links 
 RPGCC's official website

Golf clubs and courses in Pakistan
Sports venues in Pakistan
Sports venues in Lahore